Taumarunui was a parliamentary electorate in the King Country in the Manawatū-Whanganui region of New Zealand from 1908 to 1919. The electorate was represented by two Members of Parliament.

Population centres
In the 1907 electoral redistribution, a major change that had to be allowed for was a reduction of the tolerance to ±750 to those electorates where the country quota applied. The North Island had once again a higher population growth than the South Island, and three seats were transferred from south to north. In the resulting boundary distribution, every existing electorate was affected, and three electorates were established for the first time, including the Taumarunui electorate.

The initial area covered by the Taumarunui electorate was quite large. Settlements that were initially included were Taumarunui, Tūrangi, Ohakune, Waiouru, Pipiriki, Raetihi, Ōhura, Waitara, Mōkau, Awakino, Kawhia, Ōtorohanga, and Te Kuiti. In the 1911 electoral redistribution, large areas went to adjacent electorates, and Ohakune, Waiouru, Pipiriki, and Raetihi went to the  electorate, while Kawhia went to the  electorate.

History
William Thomas Jennings of the Liberal Party was the first representative from 1908 to 1911. Jennings won the electorate in the subsequent 1915 by-election and held it to 1919.

Members of Parliament
The electorate was represented by two Members of Parliament:

Key

Election results

1915 by-election

Notes

References

Historical electorates of New Zealand
Politics of Manawatū-Whanganui
1908 establishments in New Zealand
1919 disestablishments in New Zealand